Tahir Rasheed may refer to:

 Sheikh Muhammad Tahir Rasheed, Pakistani politician
 Tahir Rasheed (cricketer), Pakistani first class cricketer